Burlesque is the first full-length album by Bellowhead.

Track listing

Personnel 
 Jon Boden - lead vocals , fiddle, tambourine
 John Spiers - melodeon, Anglo-concertina, backing vocals
 Benji Kirkpatrick - guitar, bouzouki, mandolin, banjo, backing vocals
 Andy Mellon - trumpet, flugelhorn, backing vocals
 Justin Thurgur - trombone 
 Brendan Kelly - saxophone, bass clarinet, backing vocals
 Gideon Juckes - sousaphone, tuba, helicon, backing vocals
 Pete Flood - drums, glockenspiel, Stomp Box, frying-pan, knives and forks, party blowers
 Rachael McShane - cello, fiddle, vocal
 Paul Sartin - fiddle, oboe, backing vocals, megaphone
 Giles Lewin - fiddle, bagpipes, backing vocals.

References 

Bellowhead albums